The Scottish national quadball team is the official national quadball team of Scotland. The team, which is organised by QuadballUK, was founded in 2018 and made its tournament debut at the 2019 IQA European Games in Bamberg.

History 
Previously Team UK represented all the countries of the United Kingdom at international tournaments organised by the International Quadball Association. Team UK was founded in 2012, making their debut at the Summer Games in Oxford. The first Scotland national team named the Scottish Thistles was formed in 2017 for the Quidditch Premier League, with trials held in Spring 2018. In 2018, the IQA announced that national governing bodies could send regional teams to compete at the upcoming Continental Games and as a result Team Scotland was formed to compete at the international level at the 2019 European Games held in Bamberg. This team would be separate from the UK team and managed and operated independently, however it still acted as representative of QuadballUK at international tournaments.

The team had their debut on 17 November 2018 in Catalonia in a series of friendlies against the Catalan national team. Team Scotland had their official tournament debut when they placed 14th of 20 teams at the 2019 European Games held on 28–30 June.

In 2021 Team UK was officially disbanded and split into the three national teams Team England, Team Scotland and Team Wales. Team Scotland later played at the 2022 European Games in Limerick, placing 15th of 20 teams.

The team runs monthly trainings sessions that are open to anyone to attend across the 4 cities in Scotland home to local quadball teams (Edinburgh, Glasgow, St Andrews and Stirling).

Team Scotland aims to send a squad to the 2023 IQA World Cup being held in Richmond, Virginia which will be the first time Scotland has competed at the World Cup tournament as a separate team.

Competitive record

2019 European Games 
Scotland made their tournament debut at the 2019 European Games held on 28–30 June in Bamberg, placing 14th of 20 teams. They were coached by Gavin Hughes. In the group stage on day 1 they lost against Belgium, Germany and Austria but then won against Switzerland. On the second day they won against Finland and Slovenia but lost against Poland and The Netherlands.

2022 European Games 
Scotland placed 15th of 20 teams at the 2022 IQA European Games held on 22–24 July in Limerick. They were placed into group D along with Germany, The Netherlands, England and Czech Republic for the group stage on day 1, playing them in that order. They lost the first 3 matches but won against Czech Republic with a snitch catch. On the second day they won against Hong Kong, lost against Catalonia and Ireland and then won against Wales. The game against Wales went into overtime after Scotland caught the snitch with each team being one goal away from the set score for winning.

Players

2022 IQA European Games 
The squad for the 2022 IQA European Games held in Limerick was coached by Alec Bruns and placed 15th in the tournament out of 20 teams. It consisted of the following players:

See also 
 Quadball
 QuadballUK
 International Quadball Association
 United Kingdom national quidditch team

References 

Notes

Quidditch national teams
Quadball
2018 establishments in Scotland
Sports clubs established in 2018